Jan Karski Eagle Award (pol. Nagroda Orła Jana Karskiego) was established on 5 May 2000 by Polish professor Jan Karski (1914–2000), war courier of the Polish government in-exile, witness of the Holocaust and Righteous Among the Nations. Jan Karski wanted this award to go to those, who "can worthily worry about Poland" and to those, who "although aren't Polish, wish good to Poland". The award has an honorary character and there is no monetary award granted with it, because, as the originator argued, "dignity is incalculable in money". It's symbolized by the Eagle statuette, the project of which was approved by Jan Karski. The organisation side of the award was gifted to Waldemar Piasecki.

Committee 
The award committee of the Eagle Award is made of people that received this award. Its first chairman was Jacek Kuroń, who was the only one who was honored to get this award directly from Jan Karski's hands. In handing over the award to Józef Tischner, Jan Karski participated via phone. The committee gives out the award yearly on June 24, on Jan Karski's birthday.

Winners 

 2000: Jacek Kuroń, Józef Tischner
 2001: Rabin Jacob Baker from Jedwabne and Krzysztof Godlewski, mayor of Jedwabne
 2002: Grzegorz Pawłowski, Marek Edelman
 2003: Tadeusz Mazowiecki, Alfons Nossol
 2004: Viktor Yushchenko, Feliks Tych
 2005: Tygodnik Powszechny, Oriana Fallaci
 2006: Adam Michnik, Abraham Foxman
 2007: Elie Wiesel, Tadeusz Pieronek
 2008: Shimon Peres, Bronisław Geremek
 2009: Stanisław Dziwisz, Hoover Institution
 2010: Aleksander Kwaśniewski, Leopold Unger
 2011: Lech Wałęsa, Mikhail Gorbachev
 2012: Karol Modzelewski, United States Holocaust Memorial Museum
 2013: Richard Pipes, the movie Aftermath (2012)
 2014: The Kozielewski family, Rotary International
 2015: Julian Kornhauser, Boris Nemtsov
 2016: Nadiya Savchenko, Arthur Schneier
 2017: Abraham Skorka, Ibrahim Al-Sabbagh
 2018: Władysław Anders, Ghetto Fighters' House
 2019: Paweł Adamowicz (granted 14 January 2019, a couple of hours after death announcement), Franciszek Dąbrowski (after death)
 2020: Father Ludwik Wiśniewski, Dominika Kulczyk
 2021: Lampedusa, Remigiusz Korejwo, Jan Holoubek
 2022: Volodymyr "Vovka" Bigun, the Polish society (for its solidarity with Ukrainian people)

Special editions 
Aside from yearly awards, occasionally there are Special Awards given out honoring the achievements and merits of the winners in the longer time schedule, sometimes even over their entire lives. To this day there are only 5 winners:

 Walentyna Janta-Połczyńska (2016)
 Herbert Hoover (after death, 2019)
 Viasna Human Rights Centre (2020)
 Alexei Navalny (2021)
 Volodymyr Zelenskiy (2022)

References

Polish awards